Katja Stokholm (born June 19, 1996, in Odense) is a Danish model and beauty pageant titleholder who was crowned Miss Denmark 2019 pageant and represented Denmark at the Miss Universe 2019 pageant.

Pageantry
On 7 June 2019, Stokholm was crowned as Miss Denmark 2019 at Cirkusbygningen in Copenhagen replacing outgoing Helena Heuser. The newly crowned queen's court included Sabrina Jovanovic announced as first runner-up, followed by Maria Mawuena as second runner-up. As Miss Denmark, Stokholm represented Denmark at the Miss Universe 2019 pageant where Catriona Gray of the Philippines will crown her successor at the end of the event.

References

External links
Official site
Miss Denmark Official Page

1996 births
Living people
Miss Universe 2019 contestants
People from Odense
Danish beauty pageant winners
Danish female models
Academic staff of the University of Southern Denmark
Danish people of Russian descent